Ruso is a hamlet in McLean County, North Dakota, United States. The population was one at the 2020 census, making Ruso the least populous incorporated place in North Dakota.

History
Ruso was founded and named on July 17, 1906 and named either after a Russian word meaning "south of us" or from the first two letters in both of the words "South Russia" by an agent who brought in immigrants from Russia. The city incorporated on July 7, 1909.

The city lost its last business in 1956.

Geography
Ruso is located at  (47.837812, -100.932834).

Demographics

2010 census
As of the census of 2010, there were 4 people, 3 households, and 1 family residing in the city. The racial makeup of the city was 100.0% White.

There were 3 households, of which 33.3% were married couples living together and 66.7% were non-families. 66.7% of all households were made up of individuals, and 33.3% had someone living alone who was 65 years of age or older. The average household size was 1.33 and the average family size was 2.00.

The median age in the city was 58.5 years. 0.0% of residents were under the age of 18; 0.0% were between the ages of 18 and 24; 0.0% were from 25 to 44; 75% were from 45 to 64; and 25% were 65 years of age or older. The gender makeup of the city was 75.0% male and 25.0% female.

2000 census
As of the census of 2000, there were six people, three households, and three families residing in the city. The population density was 23.9 people per square mile (9.3/km). There were three housing units at an average density of 11.9 per square mile (4.6/km). The racial makeup of the city was 100% White.

There were three households, out of which none had children under the age of 18 living with them, and 100% were married couples living together. The average household size was two and the average family size was two.

In the city, the population was spread out, with 33.3% from 25 to 44, 33.3% from 45 to 64, and 33.3% who were 65 years of age or older. The median age was 58 years. There were three males and three females.

The median income for a household in the city was $41,250, and the median income for a family was $41,250. The per capita income for the city was $21,050. None of the population and none of the families were below the poverty line.

In Popular Culture
Ruso plays an important role in the Turkish film The Cut (2014).

References

Cities in McLean County, North Dakota
Cities in North Dakota
Populated places established in 1906
1906 establishments in North Dakota
Russian-American culture in North Dakota